Leidrad (or Leidrat, as he spelled it) was the bishop of Lyon from 797 and its first archbishop from 804 until 814. He was a courtier of Charlemagne before he was a bishop. As bishop, he helped resolve the adoptionist controversy. He also began a programme of building and renovation in his diocese, turning Lyon into a centre of learning. Of his writings, two letters and a treatise on baptism survive.

Leidrad was a native of Noricum (that is, the Duchy of Bavaria). He received his primary education at Freising Cathedral, where one of his colleague was Arn, future bishop of Salzburg. He became a deacon of Freising under Bishop Aribo (764–783). He joined Charlemagne's court shortly after 782. It has sometimes been asserted that he was Charlemagne's librarian. At court, he befriended Alcuin of York, who speaks highly of him in his letters. After an illness, Leidrad convalesced for a year at church of Saint Martin at Tours, where Alcuin was abbot.

Leidrad was appointed to the diocese of Lyon by Charlemagne in 797. In a letter he wrote to the emperor years later, between 809 and 812, he recalled how he had been appointed "to remedy the sins of carelessness in the past" that had left the church of Lyon "destitute ... with regard to its buildings as well as its liturgical offices".

In 798, he completed a circuit as missus dominicus (royal envoy) in the Rhône valley and Septimania. Accompanied by Theodulf of Orléans, he visited Avignon, Nîmes, Maguelonne, Agde, Béziers, Narbonne and Carcassonne. Theodulf describes the court they held at Narbonne in his treatise Ad iudices ("To Judges").

Leidrad did not finally take up his episcopal duties until 799. Two letters of Alcuin refer to him as bishop elect before this. In 799, he was appointed along with Archbishop Nebridius of Narbonne and Abbot Benedict of Aniane to investigate the charge against Bishop Felix of Urgell that he was an adoptionist. The commission went to Urgell, where they convinced Felix to attend a synod at Aachen. Alcuin defeated Felix in a debate before the synod and the latter recanted. He was, however, deposed from his bishopric and consigned to the custody of Leidrad in Lyon for life. He is mentioned in a letter Felix wrote that year. Alcuin in a letter asks Leidrad to send him a copy of Felix's treatise Against the Saracen if indeed he has a copy. In 804, Lyon was raised to an archbishopric.

Under Leidrad, Lyon emerged as a centre of learning in the Carolingian Empire. He paid special attention to the education of his clergy, the regulation of the liturgy and the building up of his library. At least five manuscripts bear his ex voto, having been donated by him to the church: Rufinus of Aquileia's translation of Gregory of Nazianzus; Augustine of Hippo's Opuscula; Augustine's Contra Faustum; a miscellany of logic and creeds; and Jerome's commentary on Isaiah. According to his aforementioned report to Charlemagne, he established a schools of cantors and lectors, ensuring that the latter were capable of biblical exegesis. For his reformed chant, he instituted "the usage of the sacred palace", i.e., Charlemagne's palace chapel at Aachen. He also looked to Chrodegang of Metz for guidance. His reform of the liturgy appears to have been limited to the chant and the readings at Mass.

Leidrad renovated churches, including Lyon Cathedral, and restored farm buildings. He built a cloister for his cantors on the pattern of Metz. This cloister is probably the building today known as the Vielle Manécanterie. He re-founded many monasteries and expanded a house near the episcopal palace so that if Charlemagne ever visited there would be lodgings for him.

In 811, Leidrad was one of the witnesses to Charlemagne's will. In 814, Charlemagne's successor, Louis the Pious, ordered him to resolve a dispute at Mâcon. Later that year he resigned his bishopric and went into retirement at the Abbey of Saint-Médard de Soissons. His choice of successor, Agobard, his chorbishop for several years, was confirmed immediately by election, but not by Emperor Louis for another two years. Leidrad died in 816. Alcuin praised his integrity and benevolence, while Ado of Vienne praised his usefulness to the state.

Besides his letter to Charlemagne, a letter Leidrad wrote to his sister on the death of her son also survives. At Charlemagne's request in 812, he also composed a theological treatise, Liber de sacramento baptismi ("Book on the Sacrament of Baptism"). The text presents "a skein of Biblical references" woven together. In one 10th-century manuscript from Girona, the text is erroneously attributed to Jerome.

Notes

Sources

People from the Duchy of Bavaria
8th-century births
816 deaths
8th-century Frankish bishops
9th-century Christian monks
9th-century Christian theologians
9th-century Latin writers
Archbishops of Lyon
Writers from the Carolingian Empire